Elchin Rahmanov (born 18 January 1979 in Baku, Soviet Union) is a retired Azerbaijani footballer. He has made 7 appearances for the Azerbaijan national football team.

References

1979 births
Living people
Footballers from Baku
Azerbaijani footballers
Azerbaijan international footballers
Azerbaijani expatriate footballers
Expatriate footballers in Estonia
Association football midfielders
Azerbaijan Premier League players
Meistriliiga players
Viljandi JK Tulevik players
MOIK Baku players
Neftçi PFK players
Azerbaijani expatriate sportspeople in Estonia